Najaf Quli is a male given name built from quli.

People
 Najafqulu Khan I
 Najafqulu Khan II
 Najafqoli Khan Cherkes
 Najafgulu Ismayilov
 Najafgulu Rafiyev
 Najaf-Qoli Khan Bakhtiari

See also
Najafqoli, Khuzestan
Najaf Qoli, Lorestan